Hualalai Academy, was a K-12 college preparatory school, it was the first accredited private, independent, K-12 school in the Districts of North and South Kona on the Big Island of Hawaii.

School history

Hualalai was founded in 1985 as a K-5 satellite of Hawaii Preparatory Academy in Waimea, by parents who wanted local education for their children, and business owners who needed to draw young professionals to the area.

Educational achievements 
Since it became independent in 1996, Hualalai earned accreditation from the Hawaii Association of Independent Schools and the Western Association of Schools and Colleges, established a middle school and high school, and built a campus on  that was certified a “Wildlife Habitat” by the National Wildlife Federation in 2007.

With a 9:1 student/teacher ratio, Hualalai students were encouraged to participate in state and national programs and have won recognition and numerous awards for academic achievement, athletic performance and artistic pursuits. Enrollment grew from 52 students in 1996 to about 190 in 2008.

School location
The school was located on the western slope of the Hualālai volcano, from which it gets its name. The campus is located at 74-4966 Kealakaa Street, Kailua-Kona, HI 96740, Coordinates .

School close

It was announced that the school would fold after the 2013–14 school year after filing for bankruptcy. Many contributing factors were attributed to their collapse, the main being the dwindling student body. Initially Kamehameha Schools were interested in the property and had reportedly put in a bid that was under consideration. After a few weeks Kamehameha Schools retracted their bid for unknown reasons. Makua Lani Christian Academy bought the 14-acre property in June 2014 and was able to move from their previous Holualoa campus in time for the 2014–15 academic school year. With the new campus, Makua Lani Christian Academy's enrollment jumped from eighty students to one hundred and twenty, with many being Hualalai Academy transfers.

See also
 Hawaii Preparatory Academy
 Kamehameha Schools
 Kealakehe High School

References

External links
 
 
 Hualalai Academy to close from West Hawaii Today
 Kamehameha Schools will buy Hualalai Academy site on Big Island from Pacific Business News
 Posts about Hualalai Academy written by Damon Tucker
 Hualalai Academy: Practical Guide for Developing 21st Century Learning Communities

Private K-12 schools in Hawaii County, Hawaii
Preparatory schools in Hawaii
Educational institutions established in 1985
1985 establishments in Hawaii
Defunct schools in Hawaii